Hierochthonia is a genus of moths in the family Geometridae described by Prout in 1912.

Species
 Hierochthonia alexandraria Prout, 1912
 Hierochthonia petitaria (Christoph, 1887)
 Hierochthonia pulverata (Warren, 1901)
 Hierochthonia semitata (Püngeler, 1901)

References

Geometridae